Eva Nordmark (born 21 February 1971) is a Swedish Social Democratic politician and union leader. She has served as Minister for Employment in the Löfven cabinet as well as the Andersson Cabinet since September 2019. Previously she was head of the union TCO from 2011 to 2019, and served as a member of Riksdag from 1995 to 1998.

She was born in Luleå and started her political career by joining the Swedish Social Democratic Youth League, SSU, in Norrbotten. At 20, she became a local councillor and was elected an MP at 24. After graduating, Eva Nordmark started working for the Swedish Social Insurance Agency, while becoming increasingly active at the then SKTF trade union, now called Vision. She made a name for herself as a rejuvenator of the union, partly by aiming for 30% of all elected representatives to be younger than 35.

References

1971 births
Living people
Swedish Ministers for Employment
Women government ministers of Sweden
Women members of the Riksdag
Members of the Riksdag from the Social Democrats